The Violin Concerto No. 1, Op. 6, was composed by Niccolò Paganini in Italy and dates from the mid-to-late 1810s. It was premiered in Naples on the 31st of March 1819.

Tonality
Paganini intended the Concerto to be heard in E-flat major: the orchestral parts were written in E-flat, and the solo was written in D major with instructions for the violin to be tuned a semitone high, (a technique known as scordatura) enabling the soloist to achieve effects sounding in E-flat which would not be possible with normal tuning.  An example of this is the opening of the third movement, where the violin plays a rapid downward scale A-G-F-E-D, both bowed and pizzicato, which is possible on an open D-string, but extremely difficult in the key of E-flat. (i.e. playing B-A-G-F-E) Two strings would be required to play this downward scale, whereas only one string is required to play it in the key of D. In addition, having the orchestra playing in E-flat appears to comparatively mute the sound of the orchestra compared to the solo violin, because the orchestral string section plays less frequently on open strings, with the result that the solo violin part emerges more clearly and brightly from the orchestral accompaniment.

Leslie Howard's arrangement
Scholar and musicologist Leslie Howard (known for his work on Paganini's contemporary Franz Liszt) has prepared for publication an edition of the concerto in the correct key of E-flat, with reference both to Paganini's manuscript and the first (not entirely correct) edition.  Howard's edition is the first to be published in the correct key and with the solo part.  (Paganini was famously secretive with the orchestral and solo parts of his compositions, often collecting them personally immediately after a performance, in order to avoid the possibility of other people copying his 'tricks' or performing his works; so the solo part of the concerto was not included in the original published score.)

Leslie Howard's edition was commissioned and published by the Istituto Italiano per la Storia della Musica (Rome, 2007), as Volume VIII of the Edizione Nazionale delle opere di Niccolò Paganini.  This scholarly edition includes facsimiles of the score, the solo part, and also all the extra parts that were added from time to time.

Instrumentation
Paganini's original published scoring was for 1 flute, 2 oboes, 2 clarinets, 1 bassoon, 2 horns, 2 trumpets, 1 trombone, and strings.

In the years following the original publication of the work, Paganini occasionally expanded his orchestration, writing out some odd parts to add from time to time in performance: 2nd flute, 2nd bassoon, doubled the horns, added trombones 1 & 2 (moving the existing trombone part to trombone 3 basso), timpani, and banda turca (bass drum, crash cymbals, and suspended cymbal).  He never added these into the one and only manuscript score.

Style
The concerto shows the great influence of the Italian bel canto style, and especially on Paganini's younger contemporary Gioachino Rossini.

The later addition of instruments from a military band give this orchestration a distinct aggressive and militaristic sound.

Structure
The concerto is in three movements:

Émile Sauret (1852 – 1920), a French violinist and composer, wrote a cadenza for the first movement.

References

External links
 

1818 compositions
1
Compositions in D major
Compositions in E-flat major